Grigory Ivanovich Kotovsky (– August 6, 1925) was a Soviet military and political activist, and participant in the Russian Civil War. He made a career from being a gangster and bank robber to eventually becoming a Red Army commander and member of the Central Executive Committee of the Soviet Union.

Early life
Kotovsky was born in the Bessarabia Governorate, the son of a mechanical engineer. Officially, Kotovsky claimed to be born in 1887. He also had five siblings. His father was a Russian citizen of Polish descent and his mother an ethnic Russian. By ancestry, Kotovsky hailed from an aristocratic Polish family from Kamyanets-Podilsky. His grandfather, because of connections with members of the Polish uprising, was dismissed from Russian service and eventually went bankrupt. His father was forced to move to Bessarabia and become a Russian burgess. Kotovsky suffered from a marked stuttering and was left-handed. At the age of 2, he lost his mother and, at 16, his father. Kotovsky was raised by his godmother, Sophia Challe, the daughter of a Belgian engineer and friend of Kotovsky's father, and a godfather, the landowner Manuk-bey. Manuk-bey aided and supported Kotovsky's enrollment and stay at the Cucuruzeni Agricultural College. He intended eventually to send his godson to Germany for advanced agricultural courses, but his dreams were cut short by his death in 1902.

While studying at the agricultural college, Kotovsky became involved with the local political club of Socialist Revolutionaries. After graduation in 1900 he began work as an assistant to an estate manager, but not for long. Kotovsky was fired for various acts of theft, fraternization, and other misdeeds. With the start of the Russo-Japanese War, he failed to report to his military draft processing station. In 1905, he was arrested for evasion of military service and sent to the 19th Kostroma Infantry Regiment, headquartered in Zhytomyr.

He soon deserted from the military and organized his own band of robbers, conducting raids and setting estates on fire. He was generally sheltered and supported by the peasants, who regarded him as a sort of Robin Hood. On January 18, 1906 Kotovsky was finally arrested, but managed to escape after six months in the Chisinau prison. On September 24, 1906, he was again arrested again and sentenced to 12 years of katorga. Kotovsky began serving his sentence at Nerchinsk katorga until 1911. He later spent more time in various prisons across the Russian Empire: (Yelizavetgrad Prison, Smolensk Prison, and Oryol Prison). At katorga, Kotovsky cooperated with prison authorities and was put in charge of a 10-man team of construction workers who were building a railroad. In 1913 he became a candidate for the amnesty commemorating the 300th anniversary of the Romanov dynasty. However, it was decided not to release bandits on the day of the amnesty, and on February 27, 1913, Kotovsky managed to escape from katorga and return home to Bessarabia.

At first he lived in secrecy, working as a loader and worker doing unskilled, heavy jobs. He then became the leader of a local criminal gang of raiders. One of his most notorious feats was the successful theft of the State Treasury office in Bender, Moldova. On June 25, 1916 Kotovsky was unable to escape from police after another raid. He was surrounded by a squad of secret police and, after being wounded in the chest, he was arrested. The Odessa Military District court sentenced him to capital punishment and death by hanging. On death row, Kotovsky wrote letters of repentance and begged to be sent to the front lines. Upon the abdication of Nicholas II, a riot took place at Odessa prison after which the prison became self-governed by inmates; the Russian Provisional Government announced a wide political amnesty for all prisoners to be released.

Revolutionary days

During the last part of World War I, Kotovsky was sent to the Romanian front. In 1918, he sided with the Communists in Tiraspol, taking command of a revolutionary battalion and helping the Bolsheviks gain control of Ukraine. He joined the Russian Communist Party (Bolsheviks) in 1920. In 1924, he took an active part in the foundation of the Moldavian Autonomous Soviet Socialist Republic in Transnistria, as part of the Ukrainian SSR.

He was killed near Odessa by his deputy and friend Seider Meyer in 1925. He was then buried in a mausoleum in Birzula, which was renamed Kotovsk in 1935, a town included in the newly created Odessa Oblast. The mausoleum was later destroyed by Romanian troops during World War II - Transnistria (World War II). In May 2016 Kotovsk was renamed Podilsk and Kotovsk Raion—Podilsk Raion in order to comply with the 2015 laws prohibiting names of Communist origin.

Two other towns in the Soviet Union were also named Kotovsk. One of them was his native Hînceşti, which regained its former name in 1990. The other one is in Tambov Oblast, Russia.

Literature
Kotovsky appears as an important character in the novel "Chapayev and Void" by modern Russian writer Viktor Pelevin. In this novel, Kotovsky is shown as a man who talks about philosophical questions and is addicted to cocaine.

See also
 Mishka Yaponchik, Sholom Schwartzbard

References

External links
This article is partially translated from Russian Wikipedia

 
 
 
 
 
 Burda, E. Kotovsky, who is he? (Котовский - кто он?). Agency of political news. 2012-2-15

1881 births
1925 deaths
Bessarabian Bolsheviks
Soviet military personnel of the Russian Civil War
Politicians of the Moldavian Autonomous Soviet Socialist Republic 
Moldovan gangsters
Bank robbers
Recipients of the Cross of St. George
Recipients of the Order of the Red Banner
People from Hîncești District
People from Kishinyovsky Uyezd
People from the Russian Empire of Polish descent
Moldovan people of Polish descent
Soviet people of Polish descent